Pokiri is a 2006 Indian Telugu-language action thriller and gangster film written and directed by Puri Jagannadh. The film was produced by Jagannadh and Manjula Ghattamaneni by their respective production companies Vaishno Academy and Indira Productions. The film stars Mahesh Babu, Ileana D'Cruz and Prakash Raj while Nassar, Ashish Vidyarthi and Sayaji Shinde appear in prominent roles. The plot revolves around a local goon whose killer instincts earn him not only his girlfriend's disapproval and a corrupt cop's enmity but also the attention of a wanted don.

Made on a budget of around 12 crore, the film's principal photography commenced in November 2005 and lasted until April 2006. Most of the film was shot in and around Hyderabad and Chennai, except for a song which was shot at the province of Phuket in Thailand and the city of Bangkok. Shyam K. Naidu was the film's cinematographer, and it was edited by Marthand K. Venkatesh. The soundtrack and background score were composed by Mani Sharma.

Pokiri was released on 28 April 2006, to highly positive critical feedback for its direction, screenplay, storyline, plot twist, music & background score & performances especially Mahesh Babu being singled out to praise. The film grossed 66 crore worldwide and remained the highest-grossing Telugu film for three years until it was surpassed by Magadheera in 2009. The film was also one of the fourteen southern Indian films to be screened at the International Indian Film Academy Awards (IIFA) Film festival, along with   V. V. Vinayak's  Tagore in 2006. The film won five Nandi Awards and two Filmfare Awards. The film's success catapulted Ileana into limelight and stardom and brought recognition to Jagannadh as a writer and director. It was remade in Tamil as Pokkiri (2007), in Hindi as Wanted (2009), in Kannada as Porki (2010). Pokiri is considered to be one of the best films of Mahesh Babu & Puri Jagannadh and also in Telugu Cinema.

Plot 
In Hyderabad, two rival mafia gangs headed by Dubai-based don Ali Bhai and Narayana resort to criminal activities such as extortion, contract killing and coercion to take control of the city. The new DCP, Sayyad Mohammad Pasha Qadri, focuses on making Hyderabad a better place by working on arresting all of them. 

Pandu, a thug working for money and living in Hyderabad along with his friends including Ajay, is hired by Narayana to beat up Ali Bhai's henchmen Nayar. He later joins Ali Bhai's gang for monetary reasons. He falls in love with Shruti, an aerobics master in his friend Ajay's father, Suryanarayana's fitness center. Shruti lives with her widowed mother and brother and her neighbour Brahmi, a software engineer, who pesters her to marry him. A corrupt police officer named Pasupathy, who works for Ali Bhai, lusts after Shruti. He is determined to make her his mistress, undeterred by Shruti's multiple rejections. After Pandu kills a henchman of Narayana, he is confronted by Pasupathy. At the same time Pasupathy sees Shruti passing by and starts to harass her. Pandu uses his wits to prevent Shruti from being molested. She meets him the next day to thank him. 

Pandu introduces himself as a self-employed person who undertakes any activity for money. They develop unspoken feelings for each other. Brahmi gets jealous of the growing relationship between Shruti and Pandu and informs Pasupathy out of spite. Pasupathy threatens Shruti and Pandu individually. Shruti's employer, Suryanarayana, also the father of Pandu's friend, suggests that she marry the man she loves and who is strong enough to stand up for her. To escape from Pasupathy's advances, she meets Pandu and proposes to him. However Narayana's henchmen attack Pandu before he can confirm anything and are bruttaly murdered by Pandu in the ensuing gun fight. He reveals himself as a remorseless assassin and suggests that she might want to rethink her proposal. Shruti distances herself from Pandu but is unable to let go of her feelings for him.Pasupathy frames her with a mock assault by a few gangsters unbeknownst to her family and the local residents, intending to ruin her life and subsequently force her to be his mistress. Learning this, Pandu beats up Pasupathy and warns him that he will face dire consequences if he is found guilty of being involved. 

Ali Bhai visits Hyderabad and assassinates Narayana. He meets Pandu to discuss the murder of a minister by blowing up children's balloons. Pandu rejects this as it would involve killing innocents. In the middle of their argument, the police raids the club and arrests Ali Bhai. His gang members retaliate by kidnapping Qadri's daughter, drugging her and creating a lewd video of her which they threaten to release to the media if Ali Bhai is not released, forcing the embattled Qadri to release Ali Bhai. Though in a drugged state, Qadri's daughter reveals that her father had placed an undercover officer as a mole in Ali Bhai's gang. The gang members find out that an IPS officer named Krishna Manohar, the son of a retired inspector Suryanarayana, has gone undercover to finish off the syndicate and is now a part of their gang. 

Ali Bhai kills Ajay, believing the latter to be Krishna Manohar. However, it is revealed that Ajay was actually Suryanarayana's adopted son. Ali Bhai then kills Suryanarayana to lure the real Krishna Manohar. When Krishna Manohar actually turns up, everyone, especially Shruthi, Ali Bhai and Pasupathy are shocked to see that he is Pandu. After Suryanarayana and Ajay's cremation, Pandu forces Pasupathy to call Ali Bhai to find out his location, which is Binny Mills. Pandu arrives at Binny Mills and starts to kill Ali Bhai's gang members one by one, rescuing Qadri's daughter in the process. In a final confrontation, Pandu kills Ali Bhai by slashing his throat with a broken glass window and shoots Pasupathy by saying the following words: Okkasaari commit ayithe naa maata nene vinanu.

Cast 

 Mahesh Babu as Pandu / Krishna Manohar IPS
 Ileana D'Cruz as Shruti
 Prakash Raj as Ali Bhai 
 Nassar as Suryanarayana
 Ashish Vidyarthi as Sub-inspector Pasupathy 
 Sayaji Shinde as Sayed Mohammad Pasha Qadri, Commissioner of Police
 Brahmanandam as Brahmi, a software engineer, and Shruti's neighbour
 Ali as the president of the beggar's association
 Venu Madhav as the General secretary  of the beggar's association
 Satya Prakash as Narayana
 G. V. Sudhakar Naidu as Narayana's gang member
 Subbaraju as Nayar
 Isaiah as Guru
 Ajay as Ajay
 Master Bharath as Shruti's brother
 Sudha as Shruti's mother
 Jyothi Rana as Mona
 Krishnudu as Pandu's friend
 Satyam Rajesh as Pandu's friend
 Pruthviraj as Vishwanath
 Narsing Yadav as Satti, a gangster
 Bandla Ganesh as a reporter
 Mumaith Khan in an item number "Ippatikinka"

Production

Development 
In 2004, after Andhrawalas commercial failure, its director Puri Jagannadh planned a film titled Sri Krishnudu from Surabhi Company starring Chiranjeevi in the lead role. He later decided that explaining the story to Chiranjeevi, talking him into accepting the role, and filming the movie, would be a long, tiring process. He chose instead to revive the script of Uttam Singh S/O Suryanarayana which he had written during the production of Badri (2000). He approached Pawan Kalyan to play the lead role, but he declined it. Later, he approached Ravi Teja who agreed to play the lead; Nagendra Babu was to produce the film. However, Teja was approached by Cheran, an award-winning director, to remake the 2004 Tamil film Autograph in Telugu. Teja was eager to be involved in the remake as he liked the original very much. As a result, the production Uttam Singh S/O Suryanarayana was temporarily shelved. Jagannadh meanwhile directed and produced 143 (2004). Teja had backed out of participating in it, citing scheduling conflicts with other existing commitments. Jagannadh wanted to experiment by casting Sonu Sood in the lead role, but this too failed to materialise.

On 3 November 2004, Jagannadh met Mahesh Babu at the Taj Hotel in Hyderabad to outline the film's plot. It told the story of Uttam Singh, an undercover police officer, infiltrating a mafia gang as a criminal, with the intention of killing its kingpin. Babu liked the script but suggested Jagannadh tweak the script's backdrop to suit the Telugu-speaking peoples' sensibilities. Jagannadh agreed and also replaced the existing title with Pokiri. Babu wanted the film's production to begin in 2005 allowing him to complete his current commitments. While he waited for Babu, Jagannadh directed Nagarjuna in Super (2005). While reworking the script, Jagannadh took inspiration from Marana Mrudangam (1988) and State Rowdy (1989). Pokiri was produced jointly by Jagannadh and Manjula Ghattamaneni's production companies, Vaishno Academy and Indira Productions respectively, on a budget of 1012 crore.

Cast and crew 
For Pokiri, Babu sported a longer hair style than in his previous films and shed five kilograms of weight. He used a new wardrobe and the same pair of shoes throughout the film. Jagannadh wanted to cast Ayesha Takia as the female lead. Due to a last minute change, the makers opted to replace Takia and considered several actresses including Deepika Padukone. Jagannadh approached Parvati Melton to play the female lead. She declined the offer because, at that time, her parents were against her decision to become an actress. He also approached Kangana Ranaut who could not accept the role because of scheduling conflicts with the filming of her scenes in Gangster (2006). After seeing stills of Ileana in her Telugu debut Devadasu (2006), Jagannadh signed her as the female lead since he needed a girl who looked like a teenager to play the role of the aerobics teacher.

Prakash Raj and Ashish Vidyarthi were cast as the film's primary antagonists. Raj played a mafia kingpin and Vidyarthi played a corrupt police officer, a villain's role he finds more fun to play than that of a hero. Sayaji Shinde and Nassar played the two other principal characters in the film. Jyothi Rana played the role of the mafia kingpin's moll, marking her debut in Telugu cinema. Isai and Subbaraju portrayed negative roles as well, with the former also making his debut in Telugu cinema. Ali played the role of a beggar and shared screen-space with Brahmanandam and Venu Madhav. Jagannadh added this trio to the film to provide situational humour. Master Bharath played the role of Ileana's brother. Mumaith Khan performed an item number in the film.

Jagannadh wrote the film's story, screenplay and dialogue with Meher Ramesh assisting him as script associate. Though having worked with Chakri many times in the past, at Babu's suggestion, Jagannadh instead chose Mani Sharma to compose the film's music. Shyam K. Naidu was the film's cinematographer and Marthand K. Venkatesh its editor. Chinna and Krishna were the film's art director and executive producer respectively.

Filming 
Pokiri was shot predominantly in and around Hyderabad, especially in the Annapurna Studios, the aluminium factory near Gachibowli, Gayathri Hills and the Golconda Fort in 100 working days, from November 2005 to April 2006. Most of the scenes were shot in a single take though it took time for Babu to adjust to Jagannadh's style of filmmaking. Chennai-based stylist Chaitanya Rao designed the costume styling for Babu and Ileana. By late February 2006, eighty percent of the film shoot had been completed with the film's climax and two songs remaining. This made it Babu's fastest shot Telugu film with him in the lead role.

The song "Gala Gala" was shot in the province of Phuket in Thailand, and the city of Bangkok. Prior to the filming of the song "Jagadame", Shyam K. Naidu was busy on the set of Munna (2007) and was unable to shoot it so cinematographer K. V. Guhan, who had worked on Babu's Athadu (2005), was recruited instead. The film's climax sequences were shot in March 2006 at the defunct Binny Mills located in Chennai under the supervision of FEFSI Vijayan. He suggested that Jagannadh include a scene where Prakash Raj fails to hear anything for a while after he is hit by Babu during the climax sequence.

Babu stated in an interview that he had to shoot the film's climax and two songs continuously for thirty-eight days, adding that he had to visit a hospital to be treated for shoulder pain. During the shooting of an underwater sequence, a few electrical lights were used. The electricians changed the lines, creating a short circuit which resulted in the death of one of the unit members. Babu had gotten out of the pool two seconds before the accident happened, which he termed a "miracle".

Music 

The official soundtrack of Pokiri was composed by Mani Sharma, with lyrics written by  Bhaskarabhatla, Kandikonda, and Viswa. Jagannadh wanted Sharma to compose six songs, with two duets between the lead pair, three solo numbers by the male lead, and an item number. During the shoot of Sivamani (2003), Jagannadh listened to the song "Listen to the Falling Rain," which sounded like the song "Gala Gala Parutunna Godarila" from the Telugu film Gowri (1974). He later came to learn that the latter song was inspired by the former, and he decided to reuse the same tune with modernised instruments and different lyrics. Sharma was accused of copying the tune of the song "Jaleo" composed by Ricky Martin and "Rapture" by iiO for the songs "Devuda" sung by Naveen and "Dole Dole" sung by Ranjith and Suchitra, respectively.

The film's soundtrack, marketed by Aditya Music, was released on 26 March 2006, at Hotel Viceroy in Hyderabad with Babu's father Krishna attending the event as the guest of honour. Sify called the soundtrack a peppy one and chose "Gala Gala" as the pick of the album. IndiaGlitz called it a "run of the mill" album that lacks freshness. The reviewer chose "Devuda", "Gala Gala" and "Ippatikinka" as the picks of the album, rating each 3.5 out of 5. Cinegoer rated the soundtrack 3 out of 5 stars and stated: "The first time you hear Pokiri, the sound of it is good; it doesn't start to grow on you after a while, but a few of the numbers are hummable and ring in your ears", calling it a "mixed bag for Mani Sharma". The reviewer chose "Dole Dole" and "Gala Gala" as the picks of the album, rating each 3.5 out of 5.

Release

Theatrical 
Pokiri was scheduled for a worldwide release on 21 April 2006. Due to delays in post-production activities, the film's release was postponed to 28 April 2006, clashing with the release of Bangaram and Veerabhadra. The film received an 'A' (Adults only) certificate from the Central Board of Film Certification for containing obscene sequences and excessive violence. Dil Raju Sri Venkateswara Creations, Mallikharjuna films and Great India films acquired the theatrical distribution rights of Nizam, Ceded and overseas regions respectively. Pokiri was one of the fourteen southern Indian films that were screened at the IIFA film festival 2006 held at the Dubai International Convention Centre in Dubai, United Arab Emirates.

Remastered re-release 
Pokiri was re-released in theaters worldwide on 9 August 2022, coinciding with Babu's birthday, with remastered picture and sound.

Reception

Box office 
According to Sify, Pokiri took an "extraordinary" opening across the globe and was able to cash in on the four-day weekend holiday. Pokiri was released in a single screen, the Jayaprada theatre in Chennai, where 98.5% of seats were sold putting it in second place in the city's box office chart, which Sify called an "awesome" feat. The film completed a fifty-day run on 17 June 2006, in nearly 300 centres and had earned US$350,000 to become the highest grossing Telugu film in the United States. By July 2006, the film had earned approximately 3540 crore and become the highest grossing Telugu film of all time. The film earned 11.70 crore in the Nizam region alone, breaking the previous record set in the region by Indra (2002) and earned approximately 2.5 crore at the United States box office.

The film completed a 100-day run in 200 centres and a 175-day run in 63 centres. The film completed a 200-day run in 15 centres, and a 365-day run at a theatre in Kurnool, becoming the first Telugu film to do so in the last two and a half decades. The film was screened in Bhagiratha theatre, Kurnool for 500 days at the rate of four shows per day and collected a share of 60 lakh. In its lifetime, Pokiri grossed 66 crore and collected a distributor share of 42 crore at the global box office. It held that position until 2009 when Magadheera pushed it to second place after its nine-day run.

Pokiri grossed over 1.7 crore in its 2022 re-release.

Critical response 
Reviewing the film, The Hindu wrote: "An out and out action flick, one can see the director's thirst to cash in on the audience craze for such films. Nevertheless it's Mahesh Babu's show all the way." Regarding Babu's performance in the film, Y. Sunita Chowdary of The Hindu wrote: "Mahesh's understated performance in Pokiri allows him to effortlessly reclaim the title of a star, overshadowing more questionable recent career choices". Sify stated that Pokiri was designed as a: "mass masala extravaganza which satisfies the undemanding viewers". The reviewer added that Babu's screen presence works to the advantage of the film.

Rediff.com stated: "Sporting a new, rugged look, 'Prince' Mahesh Babu has stolen the show. He carries the film on his shoulders, consolidating his winning streak after last year's Athadu. Another highlight of the film is its well-choreographed action sequences (if you can digest the violence), which give it a slick look." IndiaGlitz gave a positive review stating: "In Pokiri, the hero is introduced to us a ruthless baddie, part of the huge underbelly of mafia. By the time we come to the denouement, there is much twist and turn. If you like some racy action, fun, glamour and love, then Pokiri would be your kind of film."

Accolades

Remakes 
Pokiri has been remade in various languages across India. It was first remade into Tamil as Pokkiri in 2007 by Prabhu Deva, and marked his debut as a director of Tamil cinema. Deva remade the film into Hindi as Wanted in 2009. Wanted became the second highest grossing Hindi film of all time at that point. Pokiri was remade into Kannada as Porki in 2010 by M. D. Sridhar.

Legacy 

Pokiri success elevated Babu to super-stardom and brought recognition to Jagannadh as a writer and director. The sequences featuring Brahmanandam as a software engineer, the comedy track of Ali and Brahmanandam, Babu asking Ileana to give him upma at the railway station were acclaimed. The fashion trend of wearing doctor sleeves increased in Andhra Pradesh after Babu sported them, and they continue to influence fashion even today. After the film's release, many films were released subsequently that had titles bordering on cuss words including Jagannadh's next film Desamuduru (2007). Babu revealed that he became confused after the film's success:It was such a huge hit, that if someone came to me with a script, I would approach the result of the film before approaching the character. I only wanted to act in movies that were like Pokiri, I think that was a mistake. It all got to me, and I felt that I needed a break from films itself. Initially, I wanted just a seven-month break. I signed Khaleja after nine months, but it just kept getting delayed, and the break ended up becoming a two-year-long holiday. But I didn't freak out... I relaxed for the first time in life.

Two dialogues spoken by Babu in Pokiri became popular: "Evvadu kodutge dimma tirigi mind blockaipothundo, vaade Pandugaadu" and "Okkasari commit aithe naa mata neene vinnanu" (Once I commit, I won't listen even to my own words). The film was Ileana's breakthrough in Telugu. In June 2006, Trade analyst Sridhar Pillai said that the Andhra Pradesh trade felt that her glamour, screen presence, and on-screen chemistry with Babu worked to the film's advantage. Pillai called her the "new pin-up girl of Telugu cinema". Talking about being typecast after her success in Ye Maaya Chesave (2010) as its female lead, Samantha Ruth Prabhu cited the example of Ileana being typecast in similar roles after the success of Pokiri saying that it had become mandatory for her to wear a bikini in every film since.

Pokiri was parodied by several films. In Desamuduru, the character Gudumba Shankar, a saint played by Ali, is seen imitating Babu's mannerism from the song "Dole Dole". Brahmanandam's introduction scene in the film Jalsa (2008) is a spoof of Babu's introduction as a police in Pokiri. The same sequence was spoofed in the films Sudigadu (2012) where the protagonist is named Siva Manohar I. P. S., and also in Race Gurram (2014). In Dookudu (2011), Babu is briefly seen as a film director who makes Prudhvi Raj and M. S. Narayana recite the dialogue "Evvadu Kodutge Dimma Tirigi Mind Blockaipothundo, Vaade Pandugaadu" from Pokiri. The protagonist in Eega (2012), a fly, imitates Babu's mannerisms from the song "Jagadame" after injuring the antagonist played by Sudeep. Sayaji Shinde's dialogue in the film, "Tinnama Padukunnama Tellarinda", inspired a film of the same name. In Thank You (2022), Naga Chaitanya is briefly seen as a fan of Babu organizing and enjoying the film in Vishakapatnam.

Notes

References

Sources

External links 
 

2006 films
2000s Telugu-language films
Indian action thriller films
Films scored by Mani Sharma
2006 action thriller films
Gun fu films
Films about organised crime in India
Telugu films remade in other languages
Films directed by Puri Jagannadh
Films set in Hyderabad, India
Films shot in Hyderabad, India
Films shot in Bangkok
Fictional portrayals of the Andhra Pradesh Police
Films shot at Ramoji Film City